Fernando Leandro Fligman (born 1 September 1983) is an Argentine-Israeli association football player who is currently with Atlético Concepción.

Playing career 
In 2004, Fligman signed a three-year contract with Maccabi Tel Aviv for $70,000 a year. Due to late registration, Maccabi could not register him as an Israeli player, even though he had immigrated under the terms of the Law of Return and is Jewish. Fligman made his league debut in a Premier League match between Maccabi Tel Aviv and Hapoel Be'er Sheva when he came on as a substitute in the 68th minute.

Honours

Club 
 Hapoel Ashkelon (Official Tournaments)
 Liga Artzit: 2004–05

Statistics

Footnotes

External links 
 Profile on One 

1983 births
Living people
Argentine Jews
Jewish Argentine sportspeople
Jewish Israeli sportspeople
Argentine footballers
Argentine emigrants to Israel
Israeli footballers
Maccabi Tel Aviv F.C. players
Hapoel Ashkelon F.C. players
Israeli Premier League players
Liga Leumit players
Israeli people of Argentine-Jewish descent
Sportspeople of Argentine descent
Association football forwards